Inside Job is a 2010 American documentary film, directed by Charles Ferguson, about the late-2000s financial crisis. Ferguson, who began researching in 2008, said the film is about "the systemic corruption of the United States by the financial services industry and the consequences of that systemic corruption", amongst them conflicts of interest of academic research, which led to improved disclosure standards by the American Economic Association. In five parts, the film explores how changes in the policy environment and banking practices helped create the financial crisis.

The film was acclaimed by film critics, who praised its pacing, research, and exposition of complex material. It was screened at the 2010 Cannes Film Festival in May 2010 and, on February 27, 2011, won Best Documentary Feature at the 83rd Academy Awards.

Synopsis

The film begins by examining the effects of the government of Iceland's shift toward deregulation in 2000, which included the privatization of its banks. When Lehman Brothers went bankrupt and AIG collapsed, Iceland and the rest of the world went into a global recession.

Part I: How We Got Here
The American financial industry was regulated from 1941 to 1981, followed by a long period of deregulation. At the end of the 1980s, a savings and loan crisis cost taxpayers approximately $124 billion. In the late 1990s, the financial sector had consolidated into a few giant firms. In March 2000, the Internet Stock Bubble burst because investment banks promoted Internet companies they knew would fail, resulting in $5 trillion in investor losses. In the 1990s, derivatives became popular in the industry and added instability. Efforts to regulate derivatives were thwarted by the Commodity Futures Modernization Act of 2000, backed by several key officials. In the 2000s, the industry was dominated by five investment banks (Goldman Sachs, Morgan Stanley, Lehman Brothers, Merrill Lynch, and Bear Stearns), two financial conglomerates (Citigroup, JPMorgan Chase), three securitized insurance companies (AIG, MBIA, AMBAC) and the three rating agencies (Moody's, Standard & Poor's, Fitch). Investment banks bundled mortgages with other loans and debts into collateralized debt obligations (CDOs), which they sold to investors. Rating agencies gave many CDOs AAA ratings. Subprime loans led to predatory lending. Many home owners were given loans they could never repay.

Part II: The Bubble (2001–2007)
During the housing boom, the ratio of money borrowed by investment banks versus the banks' own assets reached unprecedented levels. Speculators could buy credit default swaps (CDSs), which were akin to an insurance policy, to bet against CDOs they did not own. Numerous CDOs were backed by subprime mortgages. Goldman-Sachs sold more than $3 billion worth of CDOs in the first half of 2006. Goldman also bet against the low-value CDOs, telling investors they were high-quality. The three biggest ratings agencies contributed to the problem, with AAA-rated instruments rocketing from a mere handful in 2000 to over 4,000 in 2006. There were some warnings about the growing risks in the financial system, including from Raghuram Rajan, then the chief economist of the IMF, who, at the Federal Reserve's 2005 Jackson Hole conference, identified some risks and proposed policies to address them, though former U.S. Treasury Secretary Lawrence Summers called his warnings "misguided" and Rajan himself a "luddite".

Part III: The Crisis
The market for CDOs collapsed and investment banks were left with hundreds of billions of dollars in loans, CDOs, and real estate they could not unload. The Great Recession began in November 2007, and in March 2008, Bear Stearns ran out of cash. In September, the federal government took over Fannie Mae and Freddie Mac, which had been on the brink of collapse. Two days later, Lehman Brothers collapsed. These entities all had AA or AAA ratings within days of being bailed out. Merrill Lynch, on the edge of collapse, was acquired by Bank of America. Henry Paulson and Timothy Geithner decided that Lehman must go into bankruptcy, which resulted in a collapse of the commercial paper market.  On September 17, the insolvent AIG was taken over by the government. The next day, Paulson and Fed chairman Ben Bernanke asked Congress for $700 billion to bail out the banks. The global financial system became paralyzed. On October 3, 2008, President George W. Bush signed the Troubled Asset Relief Program, but global stock markets continued to fall. Layoffs and foreclosures continued with unemployment rising to 10% in the US and the European Union. By December 2008, GM and Chrysler also faced bankruptcy. Foreclosures in the U.S. reached unprecedented levels.

Part IV: Accountability
Top executives of the insolvent companies walked away with their personal fortunes intact and avoided prosecution. The executives had hand-picked their boards of directors, which handed out billions in bonuses after the government bailout. The major banks grew in power and doubled anti-reform efforts. Many academic economists who had advocated for deregulation for decades and helped shape U.S. policy still opposed reform after the 2008 crisis. Firms involved were the Analysis Group, Charles River Associates, Compass Lexecon, and the Law and Economics Consulting Group (LECG). Many of these economists were paid consultants to companies and other groups involved in the financial crisis, conflicts of interest that were often not disclosed in their research papers.

Part V: Where We Are Now
Tens of thousands of U.S. factory workers were laid off. The incoming Obama administration's financial reforms were weak, and there was no significant proposed regulation of the practices of ratings agencies, lobbyists, or executive compensation. Geithner became Treasury Secretary. Martin Feldstein, Laura Tyson, and Lawrence Summers were all top economic advisers to Obama. Bernanke was reappointed Chair of the Federal Reserve. European nations imposed strict regulations on bank compensation, but the U.S. resisted them.

Reception
The film was met with critical acclaim. On review aggregator website Rotten Tomatoes, it holds an approval rating of 98% based on 148 reviews, with an average rating of 8.2/10; the site's "critics consensus" reads: "Disheartening but essential viewing, Charles Ferguson's documentary explores the 2008 Global Financial Crisis with exemplary rigor." On Metacritic, the film has a weighted average score of 88 out of 100 based on 27 critics, indicating "universal acclaim", and, in 2011, Jason Dietz of Metacritic ranked the film as the best film yet made about the "ongoing financial crisis".

Roger Ebert described the film as "an angry, well-argued documentary about how the American housing industry set out deliberately to defraud the ordinary American investor". A. O. Scott of The New York Times wrote that "Mr. Ferguson has summoned the scourging moral force of a pulpit-shaking sermon. That he delivers it with rigor, restraint and good humor makes his case all the more devastating".  Logan Hill of New York magazine characterized the film as a "rip-snorting, indignant documentary", noting the "effective presence" of narrator Matt Damon. Peter Bradshaw of The Guardian said it was "as gripping as any thriller", and also noted the influence of Michael Moore on the film, which he described as "a Moore film with the gags and stunts removed".

The film was selected for a special screening at the 2010 Cannes Film Festival. A reviewer writing from Cannes characterized it as "a complex story told exceedingly well and with a great deal of unalloyed anger".

Accolades

See also

Films and series related to 2007-8 financial crisis

References

External links
 
 
 
 
 IONCINEMA.com TIFF 2010 Viral: Charles Ferguson's Inside Job
 Radio interview for 'It's The Economy' with Claudia Cragg KGNU

2010 films
2010 documentary films
American business films
American documentary films
Best Documentary Feature Academy Award winners
Documentary films about American politics
Documentary films about business
Documentary films about the Great Recession
Wall Street films
Films about financial crises
Films scored by Alex Heffes
Sony Pictures Classics films
2010s English-language films
2010s American films